Koloskovo is a rural locality (a selo) and the administrative center of Koloskovskoye Rural Settlement, Valuysky District, Belgorod Oblast, Russia. The population was 882 as of 2010. There are 11 streets.

Geography 
Koloskovo is located 11 km northwest of Valuyki (the district's administrative centre) by road. Lavy is the nearest rural locality.

References 

Rural localities in Valuysky District